Louis le Comte (1655–1728), also Louis-Daniel Lecomte, was a French Jesuit who participated in the 1687 French Jesuit mission to China under Jean de Fontaney. He arrived in China on 7 February 1688.

He returned to France in 1691 as Procurator of the Jesuits. His Nouveau mémoire sur l'état présent de la Chine, which was published in Paris in 1696, caused great debate within the Chinese Rites Controversy.

By 1696, he had been appointed Mathematician to the King of France.

See also
Jesuit China missions

Notes

References
N. Standaert The interweaving of rituals: funerals in the cultural exchange between China and Europe, University of Washington Press, 2008, 
 Xiping Zhang, Deshu Ding, Jinping Ye, Xiping Zhang, Deshu Ding, Jinping Ye Following the Steps of Matteo Ricci to China, published by 五洲传播出版社 (Wu zhou chuan bo chu ban she), Beijing, 2006 , 

17th-century French Jesuits
1655 births
1728 deaths
French Roman Catholic missionaries
Jesuit missionaries in China
French expatriates in China